= Salilah =

Coordinates: 16°00′N 48°49′E

- Interactive map of Salilah
- Country: Yemen
- Governorate: Hadhramaut
- Time zone: UTC+3 (Yemen Standard Time)

Salilah is a village in eastern Yemen. It is located in the Hadhramaut Governorate.
